A soap opera is an ongoing, episodic work of fiction presented in serial format on television, radio, or other media.

Soap opera may also refer to:

Films
Soap Opera (1964 film), a 1964 film by Andy Warhol 
 Soap Opera, a 2004 film by Wuershan
 Soap Opera (2014 film), a 2014 film starring Cristiana Capotondi

Periodicals

 Soap Opera Digest, a magazine chronicling the stories airing on American soap operas and the off-screen lives of the actors
 Soap Opera Magazine, a weekly periodical devoted to interviews and recaps of American soap operas
 Soap Opera Update, a magazine dedicated to the coverage of soap operas
 Soap Opera Weekly, a soap magazine which features soap operas and soap stars

Other uses
 Soap Opera (album), a 1975 album by The Kinks
 Soap Opera Digest Awards, award show held by the daytime television magazine Soap Opera Digest
Soap Opera Effect, a  video side effect of LCD TVs with "Motion Interpolation" technology
 Soap opera rapid aging syndrome, a continuity error in literature or television

See also
Soap (TV series)
Telenovela (TV series)
Telenovela